The Manishtushu Obelisk is a diorite, four-sided stele. The stele is obelisk-shaped, as well as it narrows upward to its (damaged) top, in a pyramidal-form. The obelisk was erected by Manishtushu, son of Sargon the Great, of the Akkadian Empire, who ruled circa 2270–2255 BC.

As a spoil of war, the stele was taken to Susa by the Elamite king Shutruk-Nakhunte in the 12th century BC.

Description and purpose 

The Manishtushu Obelisk is 1.4 m tall, and 0.6 m wide on its four sides. It is made of deep black diorite, and incised in Akkadian language cuneiform in horizontal rows on all sides. The cuneiform is written within 1519 boxes, as lined registers. The material was imported into Sumer from Magan – today the area covered by the United Arab Emirates and Oman, and on clay tablets Manishtushu recorded: "From mountains beyond the 'lower sea' (Persian Gulf), he took black stones; he loaded [them] on boats and docked [them] on the quay at Akkad. He fashioned his statue [and] dedicated [it] to Enlil."

The obelisk text is a legal record that records the distribution of four parcels of land, in large estates, and its allotment to his officers, for his control of Kish.

Ilshu-rabi
The name of Ilšu-rabi as Governor of Pashime appears in the Manishtushu Obelisk inscription, in several mentions of his son Ipulum, who is said to be:

References

External links
Manishtusu Obelisk, Near Eastern Antiquities, Louvre

23rd-century BC steles
Ancient Near East steles
Ancient obelisks
Babylonia
Akkadian inscriptions